The Miracle is a South Korean 16-minute short film starring Taemin and Minah, which parodies TV series Master's Sun and The Heirs. It aired on SBS on 29 December 2013 during the SBS Gayo Daejeon.

Plot
Tae Gong-shil (Son Na-eun) gets the request from ghosts to find a way to warm the hearts of everyone in the world. With the help of Kang Woo (Seo In-guk), who introduces her to Kim Tan (Taemin), Tae Gong-shil is able get the help of Cha Eun-sang (Minah). Cha Eun-sang asks the question "When do people's hearts become warm?" on her social network account. This question spreads online and various characters and idols answer in different ways that music warms their hearts. Kim Tan, Cha Eun-sang, Joo Joong-won (Jang Wooyoung), and Tae Gong-shil recruit the help of famous composer Kim Hyung-suk, as well as Yoon Chan-young (Kang Min-hyuk) and Lee Bo-na (Krystal) to form the "You Make Miracle-2013 Friendship Project".

|-
|Bang Minah|| as Cha Eun

|-
|Jang Wooyoung|| as Joo Jong-won
|-
|Son Na-eun|| as Tae Gong-shil
|-
|Supporting characters
|-
|Seo In-guk|| as Kang Woo
|-
|Krystal Jung|| as Lee Bo-na
|-
|Kang Min-hyuk|| as Yoon Chan-young
|-
|K.Will|| as Choi Young-do
|}

References

2013 television films
2013 films
Korean-language television shows
2013 in South Korean television